Étienne Wasmer (born 1970) is a French professor and economist currently holding a Professorship at New York University in Abu Dhabi. Wasmer mainly focuses on the fields of labor economics, job search theory, discrimination and human capital. He teaches microeconomics and labor economics.

Education
Wasmer studied at École Polytechnique, 1990–1993 and DEA Analyse et Politique Économique, 1994.
He received his PhD from London School of Economics in 1997 where he worked under Nobel laureate Sir Christopher A. Pissarides. His thesis was titled Changes in the composition of labour supply: Implications for wages and unemployment.

Career
His notable positions include:
Chaire de recherche du Canada, UQAM,
Professeur des universités à Metz,
Associated Professor & Research Fellow, ECARES, Université Libre de Bruxelles, Brussels,
and
Research Fellow, Institute for International Economic Studies, Stockholm.

Current
Wasmer is currently Professor at New York University Abu Dhabi. He joined from Sciences Po Paris, where he was also a Researcher at the OFCE. He is also a Research Fellow at CEPR, London and a Research Fellow at Institute for the Study of Labor (IZA), Bonn.

Main thesis
According to Wasmer, the European social model implies a considerable sectorial specialisation of workers  Wasmer contends that the model is effective during times of macroeconomic stability but weak during macroeconomic turbulence.

His favorite thesis is that of the counterproductive effects of protective legislation. For example, property owners who must cope with unpaid bills for months because of red tape deny leases to poor tenants.

Main publications
Cahuc, P., Marque, F. and Wasmer, E. (2007). 'Intrafirm wage bargaining in matching models: macroeconomic implications and resolution methods with multiple labor inputs', forthcoming, International Economic Review.
Wasmer, E. (2007). 'Links between Labor Supply and Unemployment: Theory and Empirics', forthcoming, Journal of Population Economics
Wasmer, E. (2006). 'Interpreting Europe-US Labor Market Differences : the Specificity of Human Capital Investments', American Economic Review, June, Volume 96(3), pp 811–831
Garibaldi, P. and Wasmer, E. (2005). 'Labor Market Flows and Equilibrium Search Unemployment', Journal of the European Economic Association, Vol 3(2), June, pp. 851–882.
Wasmer, E. et Weil, P. (2004). 'The Macroeconomics of Credit and Labor Market Imperfections', American Economic Review, September, 94(4), pp 944–963.
Wasmer, E. et Zenou, Y. (2006). 'Does Space Affect Search? A Theory of Local Unemployment', Labour Economics: An International Journal, Vol 13, pp. 143–165.
Carcillo, S. and Wasmer, E. (2003). 'Discrimination and Bilateral Human Capital Investments Decisions', Annales d'Economie et Statistiques, special issue on Discrimination, Vol. 71-72, pp 317–345
Wasmer, E. and Zenou, Y. (2002). 'Does City Structure Affect Job Search and Welfare?', Journal of Urban Economics, 51, pp. 515–541.
Wasmer, E. (2001). 'Measuring human capital in the labor market: the supply of experience in 8 OECD countries', European Economic Review P&P, 45, pp. 861–874.
Wasmer, E. (1999). 'Competition for Jobs in a Growing Economy and the Emergence of Dualism in Employment', The Economic Journal, July 1999, Vol. 109, no 457, pp. 349–371

References

External links
Étienne Wasmer posts almost daily on his blog 

1970 births
Living people
French economists
École Polytechnique alumni
Academic staff of the Université du Québec à Montréal